The 2001 Southend-on-Sea Council election took place on 7 June 2001 to elect members of Southend-on-Sea Unitary Council in Essex, England. The whole council was up for election with boundary changes since the last election in 2000 increasing the number of seats by 12. The Conservative party stayed in overall control of the council.

Election result
The results saw the Conservative increase their majority on the council after winning 32 of the 51 seats on the council. The Labour party won 12 seats to become the main opposition, while the Liberal Democrats dropped to 7 seats.

Ward results

References

2001
2001 English local elections
June 2001 events in the United Kingdom